The Volkswagen Crafter, introduced in 2006, is the largest three- to five-ton van produced and sold by the German automaker Volkswagen Commercial Vehicles. The Crafter officially replaced the Volkswagen Transporter LT that was launched in 1975, although it is known as the LT3, its production plant code.

Like the second-generation LT, the first-generation Crafter is a rebadged Mercedes-Benz Sprinter, built by Daimler AG, with a powertrain by Volkswagen. The Daimler variant has been also sold by Daimler as the Freightliner Sprinter and Dodge Sprinter. An all-electric variant, the e-Crafter, was released in 2017.

Starting with the 2017 model year, the Crafter has been designed and built by Volkswagen, and no longer associated with the Sprinter. A version of the Crafter is also sold by MAN Truck & Bus as the MAN TGE. Its major European competitors include the Renault Master, Ford Transit, Fiat Ducato, Maxus eDeliver 9, Mercedes-Benz Sprinter, Iveco Daily, and Hyundai H350.

First generation (Typ 2E/2F, 2006–2017)

Production plants
The first-generation Crafter was built in the Mercedes-Benz Ludwigsfelde and Düsseldorf plants, the same German factories where the Mercedes-Benz Sprinter is built.

Design
French car designer Laurent Boulay is responsible for the frontal design of the Crafter, which takes cues from the Volkswagen Constellation.

Engines
From launch in 2006 up to 2010, all internal combustion engines were based upon Volkswagen Group's re engineered 2.5 litre R5 TDI. This turbodiesel is an inline five-cylinder (R5) Turbocharged Direct Injection (TDI) diesel engine.

It displaces , and uses what was the latest common rail fuel system, with piezoelectric actuated injectors for the cylinder-direct fuel injection. It also utilises a diesel particulate filter (DPF), allowing all engine variants to comply with Euro IV European emission standards.

The 2010 version of the 2.5 TDI CR engine was redesigned, correcting the previous problems of turbo failure. An engine update was also released under the guise of "Blue TDI", which used AdBlue – or diesel exhaust fluid (DEF) – in combination with a DPF to attain the more stringent Euro V EEV European emission standards.

Features
It is equipped with front airbags as standard, and side and curtain airbags as options, along with anti-lock braking system (ABS), load adapting electronic stability programme (ESP), anti-slip regulation (traction control) (ASR), and electronic differential lock (EDL).

The electronic differential lock (EDL) employed by Volkswagen is not, as the name suggests, a differential lock at all. Sensors monitor both roadwheel speeds across a driven axle, and if one is rotating substantially faster than the other (i.e. slipping) the EDL system momentarily brakes it. This effectively transfers the torque to the other driven wheel which is deemed to still have grip.

Payloads and gross vehicle weights

Conversions based on the Volkswagen Crafter
The Crafter is an ideal base vehicle for minibus conversions, and Volkswagen have a list of accredited vehicle conversion specialists.

Awards
The Crafter has won a number of motor industry awards, including:
 2006 What Van? – Overall Van of the Year (UK)
 2006 What Van? – Large Van of the Year (UK)
 2007 Professional Van and Light Truck Magazine – Large Van of the Year (UK)
 2007 Van Fleet World – Best Large Panel Van (UK)
 2007 Delivery Magazine – Large Van of the Year (Australia)
 2008 Professional Van and Light Truck Magazine – Best Van derived Chassis Cab of the Year (UK)

First generation facelift (2011–2017)
Volkswagen Commercial Vehicles released a revised Crafter in April 2011. The design of the grille was changed to the current design language of the Volkswagen brand. New power trains based on the 2.0L TDI producing 80 kW/109 PS, 100 kW/136 PS and BiTDI 120 kW/163 PS with the engine revised the payload was increased by up to 10% on some models. The facelift appeared 2 years before the Sprinter on which its based got its own facelift.

Engines
In 2011, the 2.5 litre engine was replaced by the 2.0 litre TDI, which utilises exhaust gas recirculation (EGR) in conjunction with a diesel particulate filter (DPF), allowing all engine variants to comply with Euro 5b (Euro V) European emission standards, which came into force in September 2011.

In March 2012 the Crafter 4Motion variant was released as an option with one engine BiTDI . The four wheel drive system is supplied and fitted by Austrian specialists Achleitner.

Second generation (Typ SY/SZ, 2017–present) 
The second generation of the Volkswagen Crafter was developed entirely by Volkswagen, after the end of their collaboration with Mercedes-Benz. The new design corresponds with the current design line of Volkswagen, and comes in Startline or Trendline trim. The motorhome variant, called the Volkswagen Grand California, was first shown at the 2018 Caravan Salon Düsseldorf. The Grand California comes in two lengths; the 6.0 metre (600) and the 6.8 metre (680) and went on sale at the beginning of 2019.

The second generation Crafter is built in Września, Poland, with a new factory being built specifically for its production. Planned volume is 85,000 vehicles per year, on a 220 ha sized site (300,000 square metres under roof). The cost of the new plant was about 800 million EUR.

Engines

e-Crafter
In September 2016, Volkswagen unveiled the e-Crafter all electric van at the IAA Commercial Vehicles show in Hanover. The van payload is rated at 1,709 kg, and cargo space is listed at 11.3 cubic meters. The electric van is production ready, and retail deliveries were slated for 2017.

Grand California
At the 2017 IAA Frankfurt Motor Show, Volkswagen presented the California XXL motorhome concept, based on the Crafter. The 6.2 m long vehicle has a standing height of 2.2 m and is equipped with underfloor heating. The production version was named Grand California and the model went on sale in 2019. It is the larger version of the Volkswagen Transporter based Volkswagen California.

MAN TGE

The second generation Crafter is also sold by MAN Truck & Bus as the MAN TGE. MAN is a brand of TRATON, which is the Volkswagen Group's heavy commercial vehicle division. The MAN TGE has a wide range of body types, with the van primarily being sold as a panel van, but also available as a tipper, dropside or crew cab variant.

MAN eTGE
The all-electric MAN eTGE was unveiled in March 2018 and entered series production in July that year. The maximum speed is limited to 90 km/h, and the purchase price was around 69,500 euros in 2018.

References

External links

 Official Site 

Crafter
Vans
Electric vans
Minibuses
Vehicles introduced in 2006